Dorothy Scott (born 31 August 1957) is a Jamaican athlete. She competed in the women's long jump at the 1980 Summer Olympics and the 1984 Summer Olympics.

References

1957 births
Living people
Athletes (track and field) at the 1978 Commonwealth Games
Commonwealth Games competitors for Jamaica
Athletes (track and field) at the 1980 Summer Olympics
Athletes (track and field) at the 1984 Summer Olympics
Jamaican female long jumpers
Olympic athletes of Jamaica
Competitors at the 1978 Central American and Caribbean Games
Central American and Caribbean Games silver medalists for Jamaica
Place of birth missing (living people)
Central American and Caribbean Games medalists in athletics
20th-century Jamaican women
21st-century Jamaican women